No Talking is a 2007 children's novel by Andrew Clements.

No Talking may also refer to:

 "No Talking" (Breeders), a 2020 television episode
 "No Talking" (Roseanne), a 1989 television episode
 "No Talking", a 2019 song by Lil Gotit
 "No Talking", a 2009 song by the Zolas